Molineus is a genus of nematodes belonging to the family Molineidae.

The species of this genus are found in Eurasia and America.

Species:
 Molineus africanus
 Molineus albignaci

References

Nematodes